The studio zone, also known as the thirty-mile zone (TMZ), is an area defined by a  radius of "Hollywood" used by the American entertainment industry to determine employee benefits for filmwork done within it.  Its center has traditionally been regarded as the southeast corner of Beverly Boulevard and La Cienega Boulevard in Los Angeles, California. The boundaries of the  radius includes almost all of the southern half of Los Angeles County, as well as parts of eastern Ventura County, and northwestern Orange County.

History
Entertainment industry labor unions use the studio zone to determine per diem rates, work rules, and workers' compensation for union workers. For example, entertainment works produced within the area are considered "local" and workers are generally responsible to pay for their own transportation and meals; those outside the zone are considered "on location" and the studios are generally expected to pay for these things.

During most of the 20th century, the Hollywood entertainment industry preferred to film movies and television shows within the studio zone to reduce labor costs. Thus, the zone largely determined the location and success of the original movie ranches in or near Hollywood. By establishing movie ranches around the periphery of the zone, studios could take advantage of Los Angeles's varied landscape. With clever editing, it was easy to use a few aerial and location shots (usually shot by a second unit), along with carefully dressed sets, to give viewers the impression that a movie or show was set elsewhere.

The studio zone itself, as well as the lack of motion picture production companies and experienced personnel outside the zone, made it expensive to film on location, since movie studios had to bring everything needed from Los Angeles. In turn, anyone who wanted to start a career in the entertainment industry had to move to Los Angeles to break into the studio zone.

Boundaries
The studio zone's boundaries have expanded over the years, primarily to keep labor costs down and help keep Los Angeles as an attractive site to shoot productions. The studio zone was formally first established in 1934, originally defined as a  radius from Rossmore Avenue and 5th Street. By 1970, the center of the zone became Beverly and La Cienega Boulevards, the then-headquarters of the Association of Motion Picture and Television Producers (AMPTP), and expanded to a  radius.

In addition to the traditional  radius from Beverly and La Cienega Boulevards, the studio zone also includes some locations that technically lie outside the area, such as the Metro-Goldwyn-Mayer Conejo Ranch near Thousand Oaks in Ventura County, and Castaic Lake in northwest Los Angeles County.

In 2010, additional locations were added: Agua Dulce, the entire community of Castaic (in addition to Castaic Lake), Leo Carrillo State Park, Moorpark, Ontario International Airport, Piru, and Pomona (including the Fairplex, of which a small portion is jurisdictionally in La Verne).

With respect to the locations added in 2010, producers are required to grant reasonable requests to actors for hotel accommodations if the locations listed above lie over  outside of the original  zone. Locations rejected in negotiations included adding Lancaster and Port Hueneme to the zone. The addition of Pomona to the studio zone has led to an increase in filming in that city.

Since the 1990s, many countries and other U.S. states have offered generous tax credits or deductions to offset the much higher cost of filming on location. The result was what Hollywood people call runaway production. Places such as Pittsburgh, Pennsylvania; New Orleans, Louisiana; Atlanta, Georgia; and Vancouver, British Columbia, Canada have become popular—and cheaper—alternatives to filming in Los Angeles and New York City.

In popular culture
The initials of the Fox Corporation-owned tabloid news website TMZ stand for "Thirty Mile Zone", an abbreviation for the studio zone.

See also 
 Filming location
 Movie ranch

References

External links
  IATSE (Official site)
 Interactive 30 mile map of the Studio Zone

1934 establishments in California
Geography of Los Angeles
Culture of Los Angeles
Entertainment in the United States
Film production